The Meriden Firearms Company of Meriden, Connecticut, USA manufactured small arms from 1905 to 1918.  Meriden manufactured 20 varieties of hammer and hammerless revolvers with an output of 100 handguns a day in 1906. In addition to revolvers the company manufactured shotguns and  rifles.

The Meriden Firearms Company was formed when Sears, Roebuck & Co. purchased the Andrew Fyrberg & Sons firearms manufacturing plant and moved the plant and machinery to Meriden, Connecticut, in 1905 in the Malleable Iron Company's plant. The company sold their firearms through the Sears catalog as well as via other retailers (using different trade names). Meriden introduced the Model 15 slide-action .22 rifle based on Savage patents in the fall of 1912. The main plant of the company was sold to New England Westinghouse in 1916 (which soon resold it to Colt), and in 1918 due to the end of WWI Sears closed the Meriden Firearms Company.

Revolvers

Meriden manufactured double-action top-break revolvers in various barrel lengths and finishes.  Calibers were either .32 S&W or .38 S&W with either an exposed or enclosed hammer.  The barrels were marked "Meriden Firearms Co. Meriden, Conn USA".  These guns were referred to as "pocket pistols" and were made between 1905 and 1915.  Meriden manufactured twenty varieties of hammer and hammerless revolvers with an output of 100 guns a day in 1906.

Double & Single barrel shotguns

Meriden manufactured 12, 16, and 20 gauge sidelock double-barrel shotguns fitted with steel, laminated, twist, and Damascus barrels. Some of these guns were engraved by artisans who formerly worked for Parker (also located in Meriden). The shotguns were well made and available in a variety of grades. All had automatic safeties and cocking indicators. Barrels could be had in twist, damascus of several grades, armory steel or Krupp steel. Hammerless or hammer shotguns with varying amounts of engraving were available.

AJ Aubrey

In 1906 Albert James Aubrey, former plant superintendent for Wilkes-Barre Gun Co. and the designer of Aubrey shotguns, became the vice president of Meriden Firearms for Sears. Two years later he became president of the division, a position he held until 1916. During his time at Sears, Aubrey filed for and received 8 patents related to firearms.

References

External links
 Sears Archive
 Aubrey shotguns
 History of Meriden Firearms

Firearm manufacturers of the United States
Companies based in New Haven County, Connecticut
Defunct manufacturing companies based in Connecticut
Defunct firearms manufacturers
Meriden, Connecticut
Privately held companies based in Connecticut
1905 establishments in Connecticut
Manufacturing companies established in 1905  
American companies established in 1905